Kymmenegård and Nyslott County was a county of Sweden from 1721 to 1747.

In 1721, following the Great Northern War, the southern parts of the counties of Viborg and Nyslott and Kexholm were ceded by the Treaty of Nystad to the Russian Empire.
The remaining territories were joined into the new County of Kymmenegård and Nyslott. In 1743 following a new conflict southern part of the new county, including the residence city of Villmanstrand, was ceded to Russia in the Treaty of Åbo. Remaining part of the county was merged with some territories from County of Nyland and Tavastehus in 1747 to a new County of Savolax and Kymmenegård.

Maps

Governors
Johan Henrik Friesenheim 1721–1737 
Joachim von Dittmer 1738–1741 
Carl Johan Stiernstedt 1741–1746

Former counties of Sweden
Former provinces of Finland
1721 establishments in Sweden